Shyr is a surname. Notable people with the surname include:

Howard S.H. Shyr (born 1965), Taiwanese politician
James C. Shyr (born 1962), Japanese automobile designer

See also
Shir (disambiguation)

Surnames of Asian origin